Pierre Marchand (born 1958) is a Canadian songwriter, musician and record producer.

Marchand is known for his ongoing collaboration with Sarah McLachlan, having produced all of her albums since Solace in 1991. He also co-wrote several of McLachlan's singles, including "Building a Mystery", "Adia", "Into the Fire", and "Fumbling Towards Ecstasy".

Marchand has also worked with many other singer-songwriters, including Kate & Anna McGarrigle, Rufus Wainwright, Ron Sexsmith, Leigh Nash, Stevie Nicks, Daniel Lanois, The Devlins, Greg Keelor, Patty Larkin and Lhasa de Sela. He has been awarded the Juno Award for songwriting and producing, as well as a Felix Award for Producer of the Year.

In 2014, he translated several songs by Whitehorse into French for that band's EP Éphémère sans repère.

His recording studio Studio PM is located in Montreal.

References

External links

Canadian record producers
Canadian songwriters
Canadian mandolinists
20th-century Canadian multi-instrumentalists
Juno Award for Songwriter of the Year winners
French Quebecers
1958 births
Living people
Musicians from Montreal
Writers from Montreal
21st-century Canadian multi-instrumentalists
20th-century Canadian guitarists
21st-century Canadian guitarists
20th-century Canadian keyboardists
21st-century Canadian keyboardists
20th-century Canadian pianists
21st-century Canadian pianists
20th-century Canadian bass guitarists
21st-century Canadian bass guitarists
Sarah McLachlan
Jack Richardson Producer of the Year Award winners